George Bowles may refer to:
Sir George Bowles (British Army officer) (1787–1876), British general
George F. Bowles, lawyer and state legislator who lived in Natchez, Mississippi
George Bowles (Conservative politician) (1877–1955), Conservative Party Member of Parliament for Norwood, 1906–1910
Frank Bowles, Baron Bowles (Francis George Bowles, 1902–1970), British solicitor and politician
George Rushout-Bowles, father of George Rushout, 3rd Baron Northwick